Matihani is a village situated near the Ganges River, in the Begusarai district, Bihar state, India.

In the autumn of 2022, a new bridge was approved, connecting Matihani with the town of Sambho, also in the Begusarai district. Although the bridge proposal would normally have been rejected under construction codes related to its proximity to existing bridges, the proposal was approved given the travel benefits for states bordering Nepal and connecting the northern and southern areas of Bihar.

References 

Villages in Begusarai district

nearest village= Badalpura, Sihma, Chaitnaur